Gymnothorax sagenodeta is a moray eel found in the western Indian Ocean, around Mauritius. It was first named by John Richardson in 1848. This species is classified as Nomen dubium by FishBase, but is accepted by the World Register of Marine Species.

References

sagenodeta
Fish described in 1848
Endemic fauna of Mauritius